Lyn Marshall (8 May 1944 – 4 May 1992), was a British yoga teacher, broadcaster, writer, model, ballerina, and actress. She was one of the first presenters of British yoga television programmes in the 1970s and 1980s, with Wake up with Yoga and Keep up with Yoga on ITV's London Weekend Television and Everyday Yoga on the BBC. She wrote books that accompanied each series.

Marshall died of brain cancer on 4 May 1992, four days before her 48th birthday.

Filmography

Television
 Yoga for Health with Richard Hittleman
 Wake up with Yoga (London Weekend Television (LWT)) (1976)
 Keep up with Yoga (LWT) (1976)
 Celebrity Squares (Associated Television (ATV) (18 December 1976)
 Everyday Yoga (BBC One) (1983) 
 Instant Stress Cure (1988)

Film
Up Pompeii (1971)

Bibliography
Wake Up to Yoga  (1975)
Keep Up with Yoga   
Yoga for Your Children 
Everyday Yoga 
Instant Stress Cure: Immediate Relief from Everyday Stress Problems 
Yogacise

Discography

Lyn Marshall's Yoga (1975)
Lyn Marshall's Yoga vol.2 (1975)
Lyn Marshall's Everyday Yoga (1983)

As featured artist
Parasympathetic (from Neon Savage EP) Fil OK (2013)

References

British yoga teachers
1944 births
1992 deaths
English television personalities
BBC television presenters
People from London